Ranee Kathryn Brylinski (née Gupta, born January 28, 1957) is an American mathematician known for her research in representation theory and quantum logic gates. Formerly a professor of mathematics at Pennsylvania State University, she left academia in 2003 to found the mathematical consulting company Brylinski Research with her husband, Jean-Luc Brylinski.

Education and career
Brylinski was born in Detroit, Michigan. She graduated from Princeton University in 1977, and completed her Ph.D. at the Massachusetts Institute of Technology (MIT) in 1981. Her dissertation, Abelian Algebras and Adjoint Orbits, was supervised by Steven Kleiman.

After a year as an NSF Mathematical Sciences Postdoctoral Fellow at MIT, she joined the faculty at Brown University as Tamarkin Assistant Professor of Mathematics in 1982. She moved from Brown to Pennsylvania State University in 1991. At Pennsylvania State, she was co-director of the  Center for Geometry and Mathematical Physics.

Contributions
The Brylinski–Kostant filtration of weight spaces is named after her. She originally developed this filtration in 1989, motivated by earlier work of Bertram Kostant. She is also known for Brylinski's theorem, a theorem from her dissertation on the closures of orbits of algebraic groups.

Another result, also called "Brylinski's theorem", comes from a paper written jointly by Brylinski and her husband, characterizing universal quantum logic gates.

Recognition
Brylinski won a Sloan Research Fellowship in 1990.
In 1998, she won the G. de B. Robinson Award of the Canadian Mathematical Society
for her work on quantization of algebraic groups.

Selected publications
With Goong Chen, Brylinski is the editor of the book Mathematics of Quantum Computation (Chapman & Hall/CRC, 2002). She is also one of the editors of 
Lie Theory and Geometry: In Honor of Bertram Kostant (Springer, 1994) and Advances in Geometry (Springer, 1999).

Her research papers include:

References

1957 births
Living people
20th-century American mathematicians
American women mathematicians
Princeton University alumni
Brown University faculty
Pennsylvania State University faculty
Massachusetts Institute of Technology School of Science alumni
Sloan Research Fellows
20th-century women mathematicians
20th-century American women
21st-century American women